Jonathan J. Webster is a professor in linguistics in the Department of Linguistics and Translation at City University of Hong Kong. He received his PhD from the State University of New York at Buffalo in linguistics.

References

Year of birth missing (living people)
Living people
Linguists from the United States
Academic staff of the City University of Hong Kong
Academic staff of the National University of Singapore
University at Buffalo alumni
Linguistics journal editors